The Perplexities is a 1767 comedy play by the British actor and writer Thomas Hull. It was a reworking of an earlier Restoration-era play Adventures of Five Hours by Samuel Tuke, itself based on an original Spanish work.

The original Covent Garden cast included Hull himself as Don Juan, William Smith as Don Antonio, David Ross as Don Henriquez, George Mattocks as Don Florio, John Cushing as Ernesto, Maria Macklin as Honoria, Mary Bulkley as Felicia and Jane Green as Rosa.

References

Bibliography
 Baines, Paul & Ferarro, Julian & Rogers, Pat. The Wiley-Blackwell Encyclopedia of Eighteenth-Century Writers and Writing, 1660-1789. Wiley-Blackwell, 2011.
 Watson, George. The New Cambridge Bibliography of English Literature: Volume 2, 1660-1800. Cambridge University Press, 1971.

1767 plays
Comedy plays
West End plays
Plays by Thomas Hull